The Slow Club were a short lived Australian pop rock band formed in the late 1980s. The group were signed to Virgin Records and released one studio album in 1990.

Discography

Albums

Singles

References

Australian pop music groups
Musical groups established in 1989
Musical groups disestablished in 1991